Johan Jozef Bonny (born 10 July 1955) is the 22nd Bishop of Antwerp, Belgium.

Biography 

Johan Bonny was born in Moere (Gistel) in 1955. He is the oldest of five children from a farmer's family. He is the son of Gustaaf Bonny and Marie-Jeanne Lootens. He went through primary school in Eernegem and Moere. After his school in 1973 he went to the Bruges seminary.

Priest 

On 20 July 1980, he was ordained priest by Msgr. Emiel-Jozef De Smedt, then Bishop of Bruges. Bonny helped founding a l'Arche community in Moerkerke and remained attached to it as a priest.

He obtained a bachelor's degree in philosophy in 1976 from the Katholieke Universiteit Leuven, a bachelor's degree in theology in 1979 from the Grand Seminary in Bruges, and, in 1981, a licentiate in theology from the Pontifical Gregorian University in Rome. Msgr. De Smedt then appointed him archivist and professor at the Seminary in Bruges, where he taught Church History, Dogmatic theology, Ecumenism and spirituality. At the same time, he worked with the renowned expert in Christian mystics Albert de Blaere. In 1988, he obtained a doctoral degree in theology from the Gregorian University with a thesis on the Flemish mystic John of Ruysbroeck, entitled "Het ghemeyne leven in de werken van Jan van Ruusbroec". In 1985 Msgr. Roger Vangheluwe appointed him director of the department of theology and, in 1991, spiritual director of the Bruges seminary.

Johan Bonny moved in 1997 to Rome with two new appointments. Firstly, on 5 June, he was appointed collaborator to the Pontifical Council for Promoting Christian Unity. Johan Bonny was responsible for ecumenical relations between the Catholic Church and the Orthodox churches, mainly in the Middle East. He took part in theological dialogue with the Oriental Orthodox Churches (including the Coptic, Syriac, Armenian and Malankara Orthodox Syrian Church) and the Assyrian Church of the East. He also kept the relationship between the council and a number of communities or movements, such as Taizé and L'Arche. Secondly, Cardinal Godfried Danneels and the Belgian bishops appointed him rector of the Belgian Pontifical College in Rome in succession to Msgr. Werner Quintens.

On 9 January 2002 he was appointed Chaplain of His Holiness by Pope John Paul II.

Bishop 

On 28 October 2008 Pope Benedict XVI appointed Bishop Bonny the 22nd bishop of the Diocese of Antwerp. His bishop's motto is The Lamb will be their shepherd. On 4 January 2009, Johan Bonny was enthroned to bishop of the Diocese of Antwerp in the Antwerp's Our Lady Cathedral by Cardinal Godfried Danneels, Bishop Paul Van den Berghe and Bishop Roger Vangheluwe in presence of various religious and civil dignitaries, including Cardinal Walter Kasper, Archbishop Wim Eijk and Archbishop André-Joseph Léonard.

Bishop Bonny has called for ecclesiastical recognition of gay relationships, according to an interview published in De Morgen, a Belgian newspaper, on 27 Dec. 2015. The official teaching that the Catholic Church can recognize only male-female committed relationships has to change, Bonny said. "There should be recognition of a diversity of forms," he said. "We have to look inside the Church for a formal recognition of the kind of interpersonal relationship that is also present in many gay couples. Just as there are a variety of legal frameworks for partners in civil society, one must arrive at a diversity of forms in the Church. … The intrinsic values are more important to me than the institutional question. The Christian ethic is based on lasting relationships where exclusivity, loyalty, and care are central to each other." Bonny made headlines in September when he issued a letter to the Vatican in preparation for the Synod on the family in October. At that time, Bonny stressed that the Church urgently needs to connect with contemporary society, showing more respect for homosexuality, divorced people and modern kinds of relationships.

In January 2015 he received an award by çavaria, the association of Flemish LGBT organisations, for his call for acceptance. Bonny however said the award was unnecessary.

Notes

References

External links 

 
 Johan Bonny on www.catholic-hierarchy.org
 Progress in Dialogue Between Holy See and Greek Orthodox Church, interview with E.H. Johan Bonny, April 2003
 Report of The Fourth Meeting of the International Joint Commission for Theological Dialogue Between the Catholic Church and the Oriental Orthodox Churches, Rome, 28 January tot 3 February 2007
 

1955 births
Living people
People from Gistel
Bishops of Antwerp
Pontifical Gregorian University alumni
Members of the Order of the Holy Sepulchre